Mario Fillinger (born 10 October 1984 in Pirna) is a German footballer who is currently a free agent.

Career
He scored his first goal for the club on 20 February 2009 in a 3–1 away defeat at 1. FSV Mainz 05.

References

External links
 

1984 births
Living people
German footballers
Chemnitzer FC players
Hamburger SV players
Hamburger SV II players
FC Hansa Rostock players
FSV Frankfurt players
FC Rot-Weiß Erfurt players
Bundesliga players
2. Bundesliga players
3. Liga players
Association football midfielders
People from Pirna
Footballers from Saxony